This glossary of basketball terms is a list of definitions of terms used in the game of basketball. Like any other major sport, basketball features its own extensive vocabulary of unique words and phrases used by players, coaches, sports journalists, commentators, and fans.

0–9

A

B

C

D

E

F

G

H

I

J

K

L

M

N

O

P

Q

R

S

T

U

V

W

Z

See also
Basketball moves
Index of basketball-related articles
Outline of basketball

References

Basketball
 
Wikipedia glossaries using description lists